Hitchhiker: A Biography of Douglas Adams is a 2003 biography of writer Douglas Adams written by M. J. Simpson.

References

2003 non-fiction books
English-language books
Biographies about writers
Douglas Adams